Jamie-Lee Price (born 10 January 1996) is an Australian netball player who has played for Giants Netball in the Suncorp Super Netball league since 2017.

Prior to that, Price was with the Waikato Bay of Plenty Magic in the ANZ Championship. She was the youngest player in the trans-Tasman championship as of January 2013.

She was selected in the Australian Diamonds squad for the 2018/19 international season.

Price is the daughter of Australian rugby league footballer Steve Price, and the niece of Brisbane Broncos premiership winning player Brent Tate.

References

Living people
Australian netball players
Waikato Bay of Plenty Magic players
Giants Netball players
ANZ Championship players
1996 births
2019 Netball World Cup players
Suncorp Super Netball players
Netball players from New South Wales
Australia international netball players
New Zealand netball players
People educated at Mount Albert Grammar School
New Zealand international Fast5 players
Australian expatriate netball people in New Zealand